Brian Tse may refer to:
Brian Tse (writer), Hong Kong writer
Brian Tse (singer) (born 1985), Hong Kong singer and actor